Salak Tinggi (Jawi: سالق تيڠڬي) is a town in Sepang District, Selangor, Malaysia. Located about 9 km north of the Kuala Lumpur International Airport, it is the seat of the Sepang district's administration.

Due to its proximity to the airport, Salak Tinggi is occasionally known as Airport City.

Features
Salak Tinggi is the home to KFC Hatchery, a latex glove factory owned by Wembley Rubber Products (WRP), the workshop complex of the Engineering Division of the Fire and Rescue Department, the Veterinary Public Health Laboratory of the Department of Veterinary Services Malaysia as well as the  National Metrology Institute of Malaysia-Standards and Research Institute of Malaysia (NMIM-SIRIM). Government agencies such as Pos Malaysia, National Registration Department, and SYABAS are located at the town heart of Bandar Baru Salak Tinggi and Kosmopleks.

As Bandar Baru Salak Tinggi is the nearest housing estate to Kuala Lumpur International Airport (KLIA), its residents are mainly airport ground staff and airline crew. Kota Warisan is a relatively new township located in the suburb of Bandar Baru Salak Tinggi.

Salak Tinggi is inundated annually by motorsports fans because it nears the Sepang International Circuit (SIC). Most travellers stay at the Pan Pacific Hotel, Concorde Inn, Cyberview Lodge, Empress Hotel or De Palma Inn although the recently opened Transit Service Centre budget hotel at the Airport City Business Centre is becoming increasingly popular due its proximity to the KLIA and klia2 airports (15 minutes drive away) and is beside the  Salak Tinggi ERL station where there is a twice-hourly  KLIA Transit service to KLIA/klia2 and KL Sentral (Central transportation hub in Kuala Lumpur city).

Education
Xiamen University Malaysia Campus is located at this city.

Schools 

 Sekolah Menengah Kebangsaan Bandar Baru Salak Tinggi (SMKBBST)
 Sekolah Agama Menengah Bandar Baru Salak Tinggi (SAMBBST)
 Sekolah Menengah Kebangsaan Seri Sepang
 Sekolah Kebangsaan Taman Seroja (SKTS)
 Sekolah Kebangsaan KLIA (SK KLIA)
 Sekolah Kebangsaan Bandar Baru Salak Tinggi (SKBBST)

Transportation

Suburbs
Kota Warisan
Sunsuria City
Serenia City

References
Salak Tinggi & Kota Warisan eCommunity Portal
Sepang F1 Circuit Official Website
Sepang Municipal Council website
Kuala Lumpur International Airport
KLIA Transit Express Rail Link
Salak Tinggi eCommunity Portal
WRP
Pejabat Pos Mini Kota Warisan

Sepang District
Towns in Selangor